Kyle Hayes (born 1998) is an Irish hurler who plays for Limerick Senior Championship club Kildimo-Pallaskenry and at inter-county level with the Limerick senior hurling team. He usually lines out as a left wing-back.

Club career

Hayes joined the Kildimo-Pallaskenry club at a young age and played in all grades at juvenile and underage levels before eventually joining the club's top adult teams as both a hurler and Gaelic footballer. He enjoyed his first success at adult level when, on 28 October 2017, he lined out at left wing-forward when the club's intermediate team faced Glenroe in the final of the Limerick Intermediate Championship. He was held scoreless over the hour but ended the game with a winners' medal after the 2-13 to 0-09 win.

On 21 October 2018, Hayes was selected amongst the substitutes when Kildimo-Pallaskenry faced Cappamore in the final of the Limerick Junior Football Championship. He was introduced as a half-time substitute and ended the game with a winners' medal after the 1-15 to 2-07 victory.

After being beaten by Blackrock in the 2019 PIHC final, Hayes lined out in a second successive final as team captain in 2020. Lining out at left corner-forward he scored three points in the 0-22 to 1-13 defeat of Mungret/St. Paul's. It was their first ever championship title in this grade.

Inter-county career

Minor and under-21

Hayes first played for Limerick when he was added to the minor panel shortly before the start of the 2015 Munster Minor Championship. He made his first appearance for the team on 8 April 2015 when he lined out at midfield in a ten-point defeat by Cork in the Munster quarter-final. Switched to the half-forward line as Limerick regrouped during the rest of the provincial campaign, Hayes was at right wing-forward when Limerick were beaten by three points by Tipperary in the Munster final. Eligible for the minor grade again the following year, he was selected at centre-forward when Limerick suffered a second successive defeat by Tipperary in the 2016 Munster final. On 4 September 2016, Hayes scored a point from full-forward when Limerick were beaten by 1-21 to 0-17 by Tipperary in the All-Ireland final.

After the end of his minor career, Hayes was immediately added to the Limerick under-21 panel for the 2017 Munster Under-21 Championship. After making his first appearance for the team in an 11-point quarter-final defeat of Tipperary, he ended the championship with a winners' medal after Limerick's 0-16 to 1-11 defeat of Cork in the final. On 9 September 2017, Hayes lined out at centre-back in Limerick's 0-17 to 0-11 defeat of Kilkenny in the All-Ireland final. He ended the season by being named in the centre-forward position on the Team of the Year. Hayes was again eligible for the under-21 team in 2018 and was also appointed team captain. He made his last under-21 appearance on 21 June 2018 in a Munster semi-final defeat by Tipperary.

Senior

2017 season

Hayes was still just 18-years-old and out of the minor grade when he was drafted onto the senior panel by new manager John Kiely in advance of the 2017 Munster League. He made his first appearance of the pre-season competition on 8 January 2017, when he came on as a half-time-minute substitute for right corner-back Seánie O'Brien in a first-round defeat of Waterford. Hayes received his first competitive start on 22 January 2017 when he lined out at right wing-forward in a 24-point fourth-round defeat of Kerry. He was retained on the panel for the 2017 National League campaign, making six appearances, including at full-forward in Limerick's ten-point defeat by Galway in the semi-final. Once again making the cut for Limerick's 2017 Munster Championship panel, Hayes made his championship debut on 4 June 2017 when he scored 1-01 from play in a 3-17 to 2-16 defeat by Clare in the Munster semi-final.

2018 season

In November 2017, Hayes was again named on the 38-man Limerick panel for the upcoming 2018 season. After playing no part in Limerick's successful Munster League campaign, he made a number of appearances throughout the subsequent National League, including at centre-forward in a second successive semi-final defeat. Hayes established himself as Limerick's first-choice centre-forward throughout the championship and was selected in that position when Limerick faced Galway in the 2018 All-Ireland final. He scored four points from play as Limerick won their first All-Ireland Championship title in 45 years after a 3-16 to 2-18 win. Hayes was also selected as the official man of the match. He ended the season by being nominated for an All-Star Award, while he was also named Young Hurler of the Year.

2019 season

Hayes was again a regular for Limerick during the 2019 National League, making five appearances during their eight games. He was held scoreless from centre-forward when Limerick claimed their first Division 1 title since 1997 after a 1-24 to 0-19 win over Waterford in the final. Hayes ended the 2019 Munster Championship with his first provincial winners' medal after scoring 1-02 from play in the 2-26 to 2-14 win over Tipperary in the Munster final. He again received an All-Star nomination at the end of the season, while he was also shortlisted for a second successive Young Hurler of the Year award but lost out the Kilkenny's Adrian Mullen.

2020 season

Commitments with the University of Limerick for the 2020 Fitzgibbon Cup campaign precluded him from lining out with Limerick during their title-winning Munster League campaign. The subsequent National League campaign saw Hayes line out in three of Limerick's five Division 1A games. On 25 October 2020, he was again at centre-forward in a 0-36 to 1-23 defeat of Clare in the delayed league final. For the Munster semi-final against Tipperary on 1 November 2020, he was surprisingly switched from the forwards to defence, lining out at left wing-back with Cian Lynch taking over the centre-forward position. Hayes ended the 2020 Munster Championship with a second successive winners' medal after again playing at left wing-back in the Munster final defeat of Waterford. On 13 December 2020, he scored a point from his now customary position of left wing-back when Limerick defeated Waterford by 0-30 to 0-19 in the All-Ireland final.

Personal life

On 8 January 2020, Hayes was granted bail after he appeared in court charged in connection with violent disorder relating to an incident which occurred at Denmark Street in Limerick in the early hours of 28 October 2019.

Career statistics

Honours

Kildimo-Pallaskenry
Limerick Premier Intermediate Hurling Championship: 2020
Limerick Intermediate Hurling Championship: 2017
Limerick Junior A Football Championship: 2018

Limerick
All-Ireland Senior Hurling Championship: 2018, 2020, 2021, 2022
Munster Senior Hurling Championship: 2019, 2020, 2021, 2022
National Hurling League: 2019, 2020
All-Ireland Under-21 Hurling Championship: 2017
Munster Under-21 Hurling Championship: 2017

Awards
Bord Gáis Energy Under-21 Team of the Year: 2017
All-Ireland Senior Hurling Championship Final Man of the Match: 2018
GAA-GPA All-Star Young Hurler of the Year: 2018
The Sunday Game Team of the Year: 2020, 2021, 2022
All-Star Award: 2020, 2021, 2022

References

1998 births
Living people
Kildimo-Pallaskenry hurlers
Limerick inter-county hurlers
All Stars Awards winners (hurling)